The 2012 Aegon Trophy was a professional tennis tournament played on grass courts. It was the fourth edition of the tournament which was part of the 2012 ATP Challenger Tour and the 2012 ITF Women's Circuit. It took place in Nottingham, Great Britain between 4 and 10 June 2012.

ATP entrants

Seeds

 1 Rankings are as of May 28, 2012.

Other entrants
The following players received wildcards into the singles main draw:
  Jamie Baker
  Andrew Fitzpatrick
  Oliver Golding
  Josh Goodall

The following players received entry from the qualifying draw:
  Robert Kendrick
  Illya Marchenko
  Denis Matsukevich
  Frederik Nielsen

WTA entrants

Seeds

 1 Rankings are as of May 28, 2012.

Other entrants
The following players received wildcards into the singles main draw:
  Naomi Broady
  Tara Moore
  Samantha Murray
  Melanie South

The following players received entry from the qualifying draw:
  Michelle Larcher de Brito
  Melanie Oudin
  Kristýna Plíšková
  CoCo Vandeweghe

Champions

Men's singles

 Benjamin Becker def.  Dmitry Tursunov, 4–6, 6–1, 6–4

Men's doubles

 Treat Conrad Huey /  Dominic Inglot def.  Jonathan Marray /  Frederik Nielsen, 6–4, 6–7(9–11), [10–8]

Women's singles

 Urszula Radwańska def.  CoCo Vandeweghe, 6–1, 4–6, 6–1

Women's doubles

 Eleni Daniilidou /  Casey Dellacqua def.  Laura Robson /  Heather Watson, 6–4, 6–2

External links
Official Website
Men's ITF Search
Women's ITF Search

Aegon Trophy
Aegon Trophy
Aegon Trophy
Aegon Trophy
Aegon Trophy